The United Kingdom recognised Kyrgyzstan on 20 January 1992 (following the dissolution of the Soviet Union) and diplomatic relations were established on 12 June 1992. The first Kyrgyz Ambassador to the UK arrived in September 1997. The Kyrgyz embassy is located in the Ascot House in Marylebone, London.

From 1992 to 2012 the British Ambassador to Kazakhstan was also accredited to Kyrgyzstan. The British Embassy in Bishkek became operational in December 2011
and the new Ambassador to Kyrgyzstan took up her post formally in March 2012 when she presented her credentials to the President.

See also
Foreign relations of Kyrgyzstan
Foreign relations of the United Kingdom 
List of Ambassadors of the United Kingdom to Kyrgyzstan

References

External links
 The Embassy of the Kyrgyz Republic to the United Kingdom
 UK in Kazakhstan and Kyrgyzstan

 
Bilateral relations of the United Kingdom
United Kingdom